The  Silent Hunter   is an anti-drone laser weapon developed in China by Poly Technologies. It is an improved version of the 30-kilowatt Low-Altitude Laser Defending System (LASS) and is available in both fixed and mobile versions.

Specifications
The Silent Hunter uses an electrically powered fiber optic laser and according to one Poly official, has a maximum power that is between 30 and 100 kilowatts and a maximum range of four kilometers.  Although it is primarily designed to search, track, and destroy low-flying drones, it is powerful enough to "ablate" or penetrate five 2 millimeter steel plates at a range of 800 meters or a single 5 millimeter steel plate at 1000 meters. The sheer bulk of the Silent Hunter prevents its use on an aerial platform.

Operational history

The Silent Hunter has been used by Saudi Arabia to guard against Houthi drones and missiles. So far, eight systems have been spotted and are used in conjunction with truck mounted 3D TWA radar optimized for detecting low flying drones.

In November 2022, a variant of Silent Hunter in service with the Air Force was unveiled at the Zhuhai Airshow. It can operate alone or be used as a part of a network.

International exhibition
The Silent Hunter was first unveiled at the 2017 IDEX show in Abu Dhabi. It was again showcased at the International Exhibition of Weapons Systems and Military Equipment (KADEX) in Kazakhstan in 2018. A variant of Silent Hunter in service with the Air Force debutted at Zhuhai Airshow 2022.

Operators 
 
 People's Liberation Army Air Force – Unknown number in inventory. 

 Royal Saudi Air Defense – At least eight units.

See also
ZKZM-500, a handheld laser weapon designed by the PRC.

References

Directed-energy weapons
Military lasers
Weapons of the People's Republic of China